David Troy Palmer  (born 28 June 1976 in Lithgow, New South Wales) is a retired professional squash player from Australia. He won the Super Series finals in 2002, the World Open in 2002 and 2006; the British Open in 2001, 2003, 2004 and 2008; and the Australian Open in 2008. He attained World No. 1 ranking in September 2001 and again (for one month) in February 2006.

Career overview
At the 2018 Gold Coast Commonwealth Games, Palmer won a Gold Medal with partner Zac Alexander in the men's doubles. At the 2006 Commonwealth Games, Palmer won a men's singles Silver Medal after losing in the final to England's Peter Nicol. At the same 2006 Commonwealth Games he also won Bronze Medals in the men's doubles (partner Dan Jensen) and the mixed doubles (partner Rachael Grinham). In the 2002 Commonwealth Games he won Bronze Medals in both the men's singles and the men's doubles (partner Paul Price).

In technical terms, Palmer plays a classic all-court attrition game with hard-hitting attacking shots from his opponent's loose shots. He is known for the power of his striking, and the strength of his physical play, contributed to by rigorous attention to fitness.  His training regime involves completing the multi-stage fitness test five times with a three-minute break between tests.

Palmer has served as president of the Professional Squash Association (PSA). Following the 2004 World Doubles Squash Championships in Chennai, India, he was banned from playing in events run by the World Squash Federation (WSF) for 13 months after a disciplinary panel found him guilty of verbally abusing the referee.

In 2009, Palmer was approached by the Wallabies coach Robbie Deans to help increase his team fitness.

Following his retirement as a professional squash player in 2011, Palmer maintained his status as a successful, high-level coach at his David Palmer Squash Academy in Orlando, Florida. In November 2016, Palmer made his college squash coaching debut as he was named The James Broadhead '57 Head Coach of Squash at Cornell University. Palmer now leads both the men's and women's squash team at Cornell University in Ithaca, New York.

World Open final appearances

2 titles & 1 runner-up

Major World Series final appearances

British Open: 4 finals (4 titles, 0 runner-up)

Hong Kong Open: 1 final (1 title, 0 runner-up)

Qatar Classic: 4 finals (0 title, 4 runner-up)

US Open: 3 finals (1 title, 2 runner-up)

Commonwealth Games final appearances 

Total medals won, 1 Gold, 1 Silver, 4 Bronze

Career statistics

Singles performance timeline (since 1999) 

To prevent confusion and double counting, information in this table is updated only once a tournament or the player's participation in the tournament has concluded.

Note: NA = Not Available

See also
 Official Men's Squash World Ranking

References

External links 

1976 births
Living people
Australian male squash players
Commonwealth Games gold medallists for Australia
Commonwealth Games silver medallists for Australia
Commonwealth Games bronze medallists for Australia
Commonwealth Games medallists in squash
Squash players at the 2002 Commonwealth Games
Squash players at the 2006 Commonwealth Games
Squash players at the 2010 Commonwealth Games
Squash players at the 2014 Commonwealth Games
Squash players at the 2018 Commonwealth Games
Recipients of the Medal of the Order of Australia
Sportsmen from New South Wales
People from the Central Tablelands
Cornell Big Red men's squash coaches
Medallists at the 2002 Commonwealth Games
Medallists at the 2006 Commonwealth Games
Medallists at the 2010 Commonwealth Games
Medallists at the 2014 Commonwealth Games
Medallists at the 2018 Commonwealth Games